Bob Kelley (July 17, 1897 – May 24, 1965) was an American athlete. He competed in the men's triple jump at the 1928 Summer Olympics.

References

1897 births
1965 deaths
Athletes (track and field) at the 1928 Summer Olympics
American male triple jumpers
Olympic track and field athletes of the United States
Place of birth missing